Agnaldo Rayol (born Agnaldo Coniglio Rayol on May 5, 1938) is a Brazilian singer and actor. He sings love ballads and romantic music in general, with an emphasis on Italian songs.

Filmography
2004 – Olga del Volga
1976 – Possuída Pelo Pecado
1971 – A Herança
1970 – A Moreninha
1968 – Agnaldo, Perigo à Vista
1961 – Tristeza do Jeca
1960 – Zé do Periquito
1960 – Pistoleiro Bossa Nova
1959 – Garota Enxuta
1959 – Jeca Tatu
1958 – Uma Certa Lucrécia
1958 – Chofer de Praça
1951 – Maior Que o Odio
1949 – Também Somos Irmãos

External links
Official website

1938 births
Living people
People from Niterói
20th-century Brazilian male singers
20th-century Brazilian singers
Brazilian male film actors
Brazilian people of Italian descent